Frenchman Butte is an organized hamlet within the Rural Municipality of Frenchman Butte No. 501 in the Canadian province of Saskatchewan. It is also recognized as a designated place by Statistics Canada.

Demographics 

See also 
Battle of Frenchman's Butte
Frenchman Butte

References 

 

Designated places in Saskatchewan
Frenchman Butte No. 501, Saskatchewan
Division No. 17, Saskatchewan
Organized hamlets in Saskatchewan
Populated places on the North Saskatchewan River